Mount Dennis is a neighbourhood in Toronto, Ontario, Canada. It is within the former suburb of York, now Ward 11 in Toronto. Primarily located along Eglinton Avenue between the Humber River and the Kitchener commuter rail line, the neighbourhood was best known for Kodak Heights, once a major film manufacturing facility owned and operated by the Eastman Kodak Company. According to the 2016 Toronto Ward 11 Census, 62,620 residents are in the area, with a median age of 39.3 as of 2016, and a population growth of over 0.4% as of 2016. 24, 895 households are in Ward 11, and 230 net new households were built in 2016.  A total of 31,125 of 62,620 are immigrant populations as of 2016. Unemployment rate is 9.5% in Ward 11 as of 2016,  with an average household income of $66,447 and is much lower than Toronto's average of $102,721 as of 2016. Average rent price is $940/month as of 2016's census as well.

History

The area gets its name from the Dennis family (led by John Dennis (1758–1832)), Loyalist shipbuilders who owned the property, as well as a boatyard on the Humber, at the turn of the 19th century. It remained largely rural, with orchards, gravel and clay pits and a few market gardens. Kodak Canada moved its factory to a site at Eglinton Avenue and Weston Road, along the rail line running next to Weston Road, in 1913. This factory complex, known as "Kodak Heights", was a major employer for Mount Dennis' residents until it was shut down in 2005.

The area became what urban geographer Richard Harris described as an "unplanned suburb" in his book, Unplanned Suburbs: Toronto's American Tragedy 1900 to 1950. Workers at Kodak and the nearby stockyards once located at Weston Road and St. Clair Avenue, as well as CCM, Willys Overland and other factories north and south of Mount Dennis built their own homes before municipal services were in place, and small developers built "infill" homes, gradually filling the streets with the current housing stock of former cottages and small, fully detached homes, among the most affordable housing stock in Toronto for recent immigrants and first-time homeowners.

Building 1, now torn down, of the Kodak Buildings, was a coal fired power-plant that was built in 1914 and ceased operating in 2006, which burned 500 tonnes of coal per day. This closing of building 1 improved air quality in the area immensely.

Economic Challenges

After the Kodak Plant ceased operating in 2006, over 800 employees were laid off. This presented a major economic impact on the area, similar to the loss of the Mimico Goodyear plant in Etobicoke's area of New Toronto.

"The loss of Kodak was a blow to the community and is one of the reasons it is the poorest of the 13 priority neighbourhoods in Toronto," says Cutty Duncan, project director at the Action for Neighbourhood Change (ANC) project in Mount Dennis in a CBC Article.

Working out of a single unit in a nameless strip mall on Weston Road, just like many others on that stretch, Duncan’s tiny office has turned into a community hub of sorts.

It is from there that he leads the West End Local Economic Development (WELED) project, which is working with local residents helping them to start small businesses in the community with the help of micro grants.

“The urgent need is to create employment capacity in the community. And with Kodak gone, people lost ownership and pride in their neighbourhood leading to a downward spiral,” says Duncan of ANC.

“At WELED, we are trying to rebrand the neighbourhood from one of need and want to one that can offer something special to those from outside the community. For example, we have so many hair salons and barbershops in the area. Instead of saying there are too many, let us brand Weston-Mount Dennis as a go-to place for black people to do their hair.”

Located in the riding of York South-Weston, Weston-Mount Dennis is the landing spot for hundreds of immigrants, making it a microcosm of Toronto's diversity, with dozens of ethnic groups represented - the largest being from the Caribbean and West Africa.

"With this diversity comes incredible challenges," says Lekan Olawoye, project director at the For Youth Initiative, a charitable organization that aims to boost civic engagement.

"Language barriers, parental disconnect, lowering the bar for kids in priority neighbourhoods have led to Weston-Mount Dennis having the dubious distinction of having the third-highest high school dropout rate in Toronto," says Olawoye, who also grew up in a similar priority neighborhood in Rexdale.

And with almost 30 per cent of the population under 24 years of age, the neighbourhood faces challenges on more than one front.

Culture

In 2014 a public art installation titled Nyctophilia opened at Weston Road and Dennis Avenue. Designed by Toronto artists Daniel Young and Christian Giroux, the piece is part of a series of revitalization projects targeted at supporting the neighbourhood and its residents as it evolves beyond its industrial past.

Weston–Mount Dennis was once a centre of manufacturing, and later a centre of small immigrant shops. Eventually one type of business, hair salons and barbershops serving the Black community, came to predominate. In 2012, a community organizer proposed proclaiming it an official hair district.

Demographic
The area is a classic example of Toronto's diversity, with dozens of ethnic groups represented, however the largest ethnic group by far are from the Caribbean and West Africa with the vast majority of visible minorities of Jamaican descent. With respect to religion, there are many black store front churches representing the many faiths of the African and Caribbean communities as well as Western-European, Middle Eastern and Asian faiths such as Christian, Roman Catholicism, Pentecostalism, Seventh Day Adventist), Muslim, and Buddhist as seen along the Weston Road Corridor. Among the languages spoken are  Spanish, Somali, Vietnamese, Patois and Portuguese from the 2016 Ward 11 census.

In Mount Dennis’s census tract 5350156.01, the median income for residents in the community in 2006 as $17,771. This information was collected by the mandatory long-form census conducted in 2006. In 2011, the average household income was $20,637. It had grown by $2,866. This information was collected by the voluntary National Household Survey in 2011. This demonstrates in general, income levels are rising in Mount Dennis. Data in 2011 was affected by Mount Dennis’ GNR (global non-response rate) of 38.5%. An average household income as of 2016 is $66,447 and is much lower than Toronto's average of $102,721 as of 2016. This further demonstrating this trend of rising household incomes.
	
In census tract 5350156.01 in 2006, 600 residents owned their homes while 1590 residents rented their homes. This information was gathered by the mandatory long-form census conducted in 2006. By 2011, 625 residents owned their homes while 1646 residents rented. This information was collected by the voluntary National Household Survey in 2011. This shows residents in Mount Dennis are much more likely to rent than own their homes. Data in 2011 was affected by Mount Dennis’ GNR (global non-response rate) of 38.5%.

Access to prosperity

According to a CBC article on Mount Dennis, "Aggressive community policing [part of the Toronto police's anti-violence intervention strategy initiative] is intimidating, and black males in particular feel racially profiled rather than supported," says Shadya Yasin, a Somali-Canadian who works and lives in the neighbourhood. "This translates into huge numbers in an area where 23 per cent of the population is black."

Yasin, who heads the York Youth Coalition (YYC), is leading the charge to obtain a receipt component to police carding. YYC  attended the Toronto Police Services Board meeting where police carding will be on the agenda. Olawoye, meanwhile, wants to hold all stakeholders to account - parents, teachers and the government. "We need to get our kids back in school for them to be better employed and for that we need to integrate their parents into the work force as well," he said.

"We must give all our citizens equal access to prosperity, which I feel is not happening in this neighbourhood."

Education
Dennis Community School is a secular public elementary school at 17 Dennis Avenue, near Weston Road and Eglinton Avenue West, operated by the Toronto District School Board. The first Mount Dennis school opened in 1891 according to the TDSB's web-site for Dennis Avenue Community School (GR. JK-06). For Catholic Primary Education, Our Lady of Victory at 70 Guestville Ave is also available for education, and was founded in 1944, and is operated by the TCDSB. St Nicholas of Bari, Santa Maria, St John Bosco, Pope Paul, St Rita, St Cecilia, St Bernard, St Francis Xavier, St Andre elementary schools are all operated by the TCDSB, and are all elementary schools that border Mount Dennis as well, giving testament to the neighbourhood's strong catholic base since the post World War II era.

The neighbourhood's 60-year-old library, a branch of the Toronto Public Library system, reopened in 2013 after extensive renovations. Located at Weston Rd. and Eglinton Avenue West. The new facility was designed to be a community hub and is seen by some to reflect the evolving nature of the neighbourhood.

In addition to the Toronto District School Board, three other public school boards also operate in the City of Toronto. The Toronto Catholic District School Board (TCDSB), is a public English separate school board; Conseil scolaire Viamonde is a secular French public school board; and the Conseil scolaire de district catholique Centre-Sud is a French separate public school board.

Transit

Mount Dennis station will be the westernmost terminus of Line 5 Eglinton and a stop on the GO Transit Kitchener line when it opens in 2022. It will also feature a 15-bay bus terminal for local bus routes. The maintenance facility for the vehicles on Line 5 will be on the site of the old Kodak plant in Mount Dennis.

When he was a candidate for Mayor of Toronto John Tory's platform included a transit plan he called SmartTrack. The centrepiece of the plan was what he called a  "surface-subway", which would run through Mount Dennis. SmartTrack was to share the rights-of-way of existing rail lines—except for a turn-off at Mount Dennis, where he imagined the route could run parallel to Eglinton, using the right-of-way that had been set aside decades ago for the Richview Expressway. Tory promised that, by the use of existing rights-of-way, this new transit route could be built for a modest $8 billion CAD. Unfortunately Rob Ford, the former mayor, had sold off the Richview right-of-way. This would require multiple tunneled sections along Eglinton, eroding the cost-savings Tory promised. Further, Tory's plan overlooked that the turning radius for large heavy rail vehicles would require extensive tunneling under Mount Dennis itself.

In late 2015 Metrolinx made public its plans to include a gas-fired electrical generator on its Mount Dennis campus.

Crime

According to Division 12 TPS crime statistics], 18 shootings and 4 murders took place in 2020 year-to-date, and hundreds of assault and dozens of break-and-enter charges as well, underlying the area's youth crime problem.

The area is frequented by gangs like the Eglinton West Crips, Five Point Generalz, Dixon Bloods, Jamaican posse, Shower Posse, Organized crime in Nigeria like the Black Axe Crime Ring, Trethewey Gangstas, Scarlett Blocc and Baghdad Crew.

References

External links 
City of Toronto - Mount Dennis Neighbourhood Profile

Neighbourhoods in Toronto